Quratulain Marri is a Pakistani politician who has been a Member of the Senate of Pakistan, since March 2018. Marri focuses on social issues in her work and legislation. In her first year as Senator, Quratulain Marri has successfully seen the passage of 2 bills, one on mandatory day care centres in institutions and the other on paramedical staff in schools. In addition to this, she has submitted legislation on maternal and paternal leave, and a constitutional amendment seeking to raise the minimum working age of children.

Political career
Marri was elected to the Senate of Pakistan as a candidate of Pakistan Peoples Party on reserved seat for women from Sindh in 2018 Pakistani Senate election. She took oath as Senator on 12 March 2018.

References

Living people
Pakistan People's Party politicians
Members of the Senate of Pakistan
Year of birth missing (living people)